Red Point is a headland located at the southwestern extremity of Cape Breton Island in the Canadian province of Nova Scotia.

Headlands of Nova Scotia
Landforms of Richmond County, Nova Scotia